Asphondylia sarothamni is a species of gall midge in the family Cecidomyiidae. The larva gall the leaf-buds and seed-pods of broom (Cytisus species).

References

External links
 Plant Parasites of Europe

Cecidomyiinae
Diptera of Africa
Diptera of Europe
Gall-inducing insects
Insects described in 1850
Taxa named by Hermann Loew